Neotelphusa phaeomacula is a moth of the family Gelechiidae. It is found in Namibia and South Africa.

References

Moths described in 1958
Neotelphusa